Marie-Annick Duchêne (born 23 August 1940) is a French politician. She represented the department of Yvelines in the French Senate from 2011 to 2017. She is a member of the Union for a Popular Movement.

She was born Marie-Annick Bélan. A teacher of classic literature by profession, she was elected to the Senate on 25 September 2011. She retired at the 2017 Senate Elections.

Duchêne was named a Chevalier in the French Legion of Honour.

References 

1940 births
Living people
French Senators of the Fifth Republic
Union for a Popular Movement politicians
Chevaliers of the Légion d'honneur
Women members of the Senate (France)
21st-century French women politicians
Senators of Yvelines
People from Pau, Pyrénées-Atlantiques